The 1991 Northeast Conference men's basketball tournament was held in March. The tournament featured seven teams; two teams, Mount St. Mary's and Robert Morris, were ineligible to participate. Robert Morris was penalized by the NCAA for institutional misconduct. Saint Francis (PA) won the championship, their first, and as of 2022, only tournament title. They advanced to a play-in game against Fordham, which they won to advance to the 1991 NCAA tournament.

Format
The NEC Men’s Basketball Tournament consisted of a seven-team playoff format with all games played at the venue of the higher seed. The first seed received a bye in the first round.

Bracket

All-tournament team
Tournament MVP in bold.

References

Northeast Conference men's basketball tournament
1990–91 Northeast Conference men's basketball season
1991 in sports in Pennsylvania